Aruama is a genus of beetles in the family Cerambycidae, containing the following species:

 Aruama incognita Martins & Napp, 2007
 Aruama viridis Martins & Napp, 2007

References

Graciliini